This is the discography of Canadian rock band Billy Talent. Included in this discography are three items that are from when the band was known as Pezz. These items are Demoluca, Dudebox, and Watoosh!. Besides those items, this discography documents every studio album, live album, EP, DVD and single released under the name Billy Talent.

Albums

Studio albums

Live albums

Compilation albums

Extended plays 

BDemoluca and Dudebox were released under Billy Talent's original name, "Pezz".

Singles

DVDs 
Scandalous Travelers (2004, CAN: Platinum)

Demos and non-album tracks 
 "This Is How It Goes" (Demo, released on the Try Honesty EP and single)
 "Living in the Shadows" (Demo, released over the internet)
 "Cut the Curtains" (Demo, released on the Try Honesty EP)
 "Try Honesty" (Demo, released on the Try Honesty EP and single)
 "Prisoners of Today" (Demo, released over the internet)
 "The Ex" (Demo, released over the internet)
 "Red Flag" (Demo, released over the internet and on several compilation CDs)
 "Devil in a Midnight Mass" (Demo, released over the internet, and on the Devil in a Midnight Mass single and iTunes)
 "Perfect World" (Demo)
 "This Suffering" (Demo)
 "Beach Balls" (Released on the Try Honesty EP and single)
 "Ever Fallen in Love (With Someone You Shouldn't've?)" (Buzzcocks Cover, Released on Devil in a Midnight Mass 7" Single)
 "When I Was a Little Girl" (Released on the Try Honesty single, an alternative mix is featured on Watoosh!)
 "Surrender" (A work in progress, released over the internet)
 "Where Is the Line?" (Demo, released on the Red Flag single)
 "Waiting Room" (A live performance of the Fugazi song, released on the Pepsi Breakout Tour as well as The Ex single)
 "Things" (From "Dudebox")
 "Point Proven" (Old Pezz Demo)
 "Cold Turkey" (John Lennon cover released on Rusted from the Rain single)
 "Bloody Nails + Broken Hearts"
 "Don't Need to Pretend"
 "Chasing the Sun" (Demo, released on "The End Records Free Sampler 2015")
 "Sudden Movements (Dub Version, released on "Stand Up and Run" 7" vinyl record)

Music videos

Notes

References 

Discographies of Canadian artists
Rock music group discographies